The Psychopathology of Everyday Life is the eighth album by avant-garde band King Missile, it was released on January 21, 2003 by Instinct Records. The album is named after a 1901 book by Sigmund Freud. The album cover features a mock Parental Advisory label that reads, "Warning: Contains lots of curses: Do not buy!"

Reception

Johnny Loftus of AllMusic awarded The Psychopathology of Everyday Life four out of five stars and said "highlights include "JLH," in which Hall commends Jennifer Love Hewitt for not speaking out against war, politics, or 9/11" and ""Eating People" sets up the classic King Missile paradox, in which the listener is at once repulsed with Hall's logic, while being impressed that he's so convincing."

Track listing

Personnel
Adapted from the liner notes of The Psychopathology of Everyday Life.

King Missile
 Bradford Reed – drums, synthesizers, samples, piano, pencilina, percussion, backing vocals, production, recording, mixing
 Sasha Forte – bass guitar, violin, guitar, keyboards, backing vocals
 John S. Hall – lead vocals

Production and design
 Fly – cover art, illustrations
 Miguel Mateus – mastering

Release history

References

External links 
 
 Psychopathology of Everyday Life at Discogs (list of releases)
 Psychopathology of Everyday Life at iTunes

King Missile albums
2003 albums